The mixed doubles tournament of the 2014 Copenhagen World Championships (World Badminton Championships) took place from August 25 to 31, 2014. Defending champions Tontowi Ahmad and Lilyana Natsir did not enter the competition.

Seeds

  Zhang Nan / Zhao Yunlei (champion)
  Xu Chen / Ma Jin (final)
  Joachim Fischer Nielsen / Christinna Pedersen (semifinals)
  Chris Adcock / Gabby Adcock (third round)
  Ko Sung-hyun / Kim Ha-na (third round)
  Michael Fuchs / Birgit Michels (third round)
  Sudket Prapakamol / Saralee Thungthongkam (quarterfinals)
  Markis Kido / Pia Zebadiah Bernadet (second round)

  Danny Bawa Chrisnanta / Vanessa Neo (third round)
  Lu Kai / Huang Yaqiong (quarterfinals)
  Lee Chun Hei / Chau Hoi Wah (quarterfinals)
  Robert Blair / Imogen Bankier (second round)
  Kenichi Hayakawa / Misaki Matsutomo (second round)
  Liu Cheng / Bao Yixin (semifinals)
  Riky Widianto / Richi Puspita Dili (third round)
  Maneepong Jongjit / Sapsiree Taerattanachai (third round)

Draw

Finals

Section 1

Section 2

Section 3

Section 4

References
BWF Website

2014 BWF World Championships
World Championships